is a Japanese professional baseball outfielder for the Chunichi Dragons of the Nippon Professional Baseball (NPB). He made his NPB debut in 2022.

The Dragons chose Bright with their first pick of the 2021 Nippon Professional Baseball draft.

Early life
Bright was born in Adachi, Tokyo, Japan, on 7 May 1999 to a Ghanaian father and a Japanese mother. He practiced judo from first grade to sixth grade, which is when he switched to baseball.

Amateur career
Bright attended , playing as a first baseman on the baseball team. He hit a total of 38 home runs during his high school career.

He was a reserve player until his third year due to his struggles hitting curveballs, but had a breakout season in year four. Bright led his team to a league title, recording three home runs and 12 runs batted in (RBI) in the tournament and earning most valuable player honors.

He submitted his name to the Nippon Professional Baseball (NPB) draft on September 24, 2021.

Professional career
On October 11, 2021, Bright was selected by the Chunichi Dragons in the first round of the 2021 Nippon Professional Baseball draft. Bright chose the 42 jersey number in honor of Jackie Robinson.

As a rookie in 2022, Bright suffered wrist and shoulder injuries that prevented him from playing with the first squad. Instead, he recorded three home runs and 10 RBI in 46 Western League games played with the second squad.

References

External links
 NPB profile
 Chunichi Dragons profile

Living people
1999 births
Baseball people from Tokyo
Nippon Professional Baseball outfielders
Chunichi Dragons players
Jobu University alumni
Japanese people of Ghanaian descent